Francis Layden (born January 5, 1932) is an American former basketball coach and executive of the National Basketball Association's Utah Jazz as well as former head coach of the Women's National Basketball Association's Utah Starzz.

Coaching career 
In addition to his coaching at the professional level, Layden coached at Adelphi Suffolk College and is also a former head coach and player of his alma mater Niagara University's basketball team. Layden coached Niagara to its first NCAA tournament appearance in 1970, with the help of Calvin Murphy. In 1976 he was hired to be an assistant coach with the NBA's Atlanta Hawks joining former Niagara teammate Hubie Brown. In 1979 he was hired to be the general manager of the then New Orleans Jazz, and became the head coach of the Jazz (now in Salt Lake City) in 1981, replacing Tom Nissalke. He coached the Jazz for the next seven and a half years. He was instrumental in drafting and signing franchise mainstays John Stockton and Karl Malone to the club. He retired from coaching during the 1988–1989 NBA season, with the team at an 11–6 record and leading the Midwest Division, citing "pressure" and a general burnout from coaching. moving into the team's front office and was replaced as coach by his assistant, Jerry Sloan. "I had a guy come up to me and say 'hit me, hit me', I'm a lawyer'. I think America takes all sports too seriously" Layden said after resigning. "Sometimes in the NBA, you feel like a dog. You age seven years in one. The pressure in the NBA is intense. It's time to have my time." In his final game, Layden was ejected by referee Earl Strom after getting into a shouting match with Washington Bullets guard Darrell Walker.

In 1984, Layden was awarded the NBA's Coach of the Year. That same season, he also won the NBA's Executive of the Year and the NBA's J. Walter Kennedy Citizenship Awards. (He and Joe O'Toole are the only non-players in NBA history to win the award.)

Layden joined the Utah Eagles of the Continental Basketball Association in October 2006 as an honorary assistant coach.

Layden was the head coach of the Utah Starzz Women's National Basketball Association team from 1998 through 1999 before quitting so he could "enjoy life." Layden would a few months later quit as team president of the Jazz for the very same reasons.

Layden was inducted into the Suffolk Sports Hall of Fame on Long Island in the Basketball and Professional Sports Categories with the Class of 1990.

Retirement
Layden retired from coaching the Jazz in 1989 to serve full-time as the franchise team president and general manager, hiring former NBA player and then Jazz assistant Jerry Sloan as the new head coach. During this time, Layden participated with Marv Albert in a video published by Sports Illustrated called Dazzling Dunks and Basketball Bloopers, as well as a sequel to that a year later. Layden once served briefly as a consultant for the New York Knicks, where his son Scott Layden served as general manager for a time. He continues to live with his wife, Barbara, in Salt Lake City.

Coaching philosophy
Layden during his coaching days was known for his lighthearted approach to the game as well as to himself. Often he mocked his own weight and looks and was known for giving one-liners to the media before and after games such as "I don't jog because I want to be sick when I die" and "I once got on a scale to have my fortune read and it said 'come back again alone.'" Layden was once over 300 pounds but slimmed down in summer 1986, losing over 85 pounds for health reasons. Even after he lost weight he still made himself the butt of jokes, especially about weight and food. He was once fined $1,000 during a game in 1986 for making a satirical wave goodbye and exit after getting ejected. Once in a road game against the Denver Nuggets, there was a halftime contest where a young fan won a halftime shooting contest. Layden pulled the kid aside and jokingly asked him if he was interested in helping out the Jazz, who were down by 25 points at the time. Layden then tried sneaking him onto the court with four other Jazz players and got the fan on the court before the referees realized what was going on and stopped play. In a 1985 game against the Los Angeles Lakers, with the Jazz down by a sizable deficit, Layden left the game while it was still ongoing and returned to the team's hotel across from The Forum, visiting the sandwich shop to order a sandwich and chili. During the 1987 playoff series against the Golden State Warriors, Layden arrived to the arena in full Groucho Marx nose, glasses, and mustache getup and did a comedy bit with Warriors coach George Karl to try to make things more lighthearted after the previous game featured tension-filled moments and fighting among players. It was because of his personality that he was often used as a presenter for displaying the lighthearted moments in the NBA as well as in sports, hosting specials for video and on television, including two NBA blooper tapes that he co-hosted along with Marv Albert.

Head coaching record

NBA

|-
| style="text-align:left;"|Utah
| style="text-align:left;"|
| 62 || 17 || 45 ||  || style="text-align:center;"|6th in Midwest || – || – || – || –
| style="text-align:center;"|Missed Playoffs
|-
| style="text-align:left;"|Utah
| style="text-align:left;"|
| 82 || 30 || 52 ||  || style="text-align:center;"|5th in Midwest || – || – || – || –
| style="text-align:center;"|Missed Playoffs
|-
| style="text-align:left;"|Utah
| style="text-align:left;"|
| 82 || 45 || 37 ||  || style="text-align:center;"|1st in Midwest || 11 || 5 || 6 || 
| style="text-align:center;"|Lost in Conf. Semifinals
|-
| style="text-align:left;"|Utah
| style="text-align:left;"|
| 82 || 41 || 41 ||  || style="text-align:center;"|4th in Midwest || 10 || 4 || 6 || 
| style="text-align:center;"|Lost in Conf. Semifinals
|-
| style="text-align:left;"|Utah
| style="text-align:left;"|
| 82 || 42 || 40 ||  || style="text-align:center;"|4th in Midwest || 4 || 1 || 3 || 
| style="text-align:center;"|Lost in First round
|-
| style="text-align:left;"|Utah
| style="text-align:left;"|
| 82 || 44 || 38 ||  || style="text-align:center;"|2nd in Midwest || 5 || 2 || 3 || 
| style="text-align:center;"|Lost in First round
|-
| style="text-align:left;"|Utah
| style="text-align:left;"|
| 82 || 47 || 35 ||  || style="text-align:center;"|3rd in Midwest || 11 || 6 || 5 || 
| style="text-align:center;"|Lost in Conf. Semifinals
|-
| style="text-align:left;"|Utah
| style="text-align:left;"|
| 17 || 11 || 6 ||  || style="text-align:center;"|(resigned) || – || – || – || –
| style="text-align:center;"|–
|- class="sortbottom"
| style="text-align:left;"|Career
| || 571 || 277 || 294 ||  || || 41 || 18 || 23 ||

WNBA

|-
| style="text-align:left;"|Utah
| style="text-align:left;"|
| 11 || 2 || 9 ||  || style="text-align:center;"|5th in West || – || – || – || –
| style="text-align:center;"|Missed Playoffs
|-
| style="text-align:left;"|Utah
| style="text-align:left;"|
| 4 || 2 || 2 ||  || style="text-align:center;"|(resigned) || – || – || – || –
| style="text-align:center;"|–
|- class="sortbottom"
| style="text-align:left;"|Career
| || 15 || 4 || 11 ||  || ||  ||  ||  ||

References

External links
 BasketballReference.com: Frank Layden (as NBA coach)
 BasketballReference.com: Frank Layden (as WNBA coach)

1932 births
Living people
American men's basketball coaches
American men's basketball players
American women's basketball coaches
Basketball coaches from New York (state)
Basketball players from New York City
Fort Hamilton High School alumni
National Basketball Association broadcasters
New Orleans Jazz executives
Niagara Purple Eagles athletic directors
Niagara Purple Eagles men's basketball coaches
Niagara Purple Eagles men's basketball players
San Antonio Stars coaches
Sportspeople from Brooklyn
Utah Jazz executives
Utah Jazz head coaches
Utah Starzz coaches